Glasgow railway station may refer to:

Glasgow Central station
Glasgow Cross railway station
Glasgow Green railway station
Glasgow Queen Street railway station